Bairanatti is a village in Belagavi district in the southern state of Karnataka, India. It belongs to Belgaum division.

References

Villages in Belagavi district